Nelson Calzadilla (born 1 June 1954) is a Venezuelan Olympic boxer. He represented his country in the lightweight division at the 1976 Summer Olympics. He won his first match against Ernesto Gonzalez. He lost his second match against Simion Cuțov.

1976 Olympic results
Below are the results of Nelson Calzadilla, a lightweight boxer from Venezuela who competed at the 1976 Montreal Olympics:

 Round of 64: bye
 Round of 32: defeated Ernesto Gonzalez (Nicaragua) on points, 5-0
 Round of 16: lost to Simion Cutov (Romania) on points, 0-5

References

1954 births
Living people
Venezuelan male boxers
Olympic boxers of Venezuela
Boxers at the 1976 Summer Olympics
Lightweight boxers